Darlington Borough Council elections are held every four years. Darlington Borough Council is the local authority for the unitary authority of Darlington in County Durham, England. Until 1 April 1997 it was a non-metropolitan district.

Political control
From 1915 to 1974, Darlington was a county borough, independent of any county council. Under the Local Government Act 1972 it had its territory enlarged and became a non-metropolitan district, with Durham County Council providing county-level services. The first election to the reconstituted borough council was held in 1973, initially operating as a shadow authority before coming into its revised powers on 1 April 1974. On 1 April 1997 the district became a unitary authority, regaining its independence from Durham County Council. Political control of the council since 1973 has been held by the following parties:

Non-metropolitan district

Unitary authority

Leadership
The leaders of the council since 1991 have been:

Council elections

Non-metropolitan district elections
1973 Darlington Borough Council election
1976 Darlington Borough Council election (Borough boundary changes took place but the number of seats remained the same)
1979 Darlington Borough Council election (New ward boundaries)
1983 Darlington Borough Council election
1987 Darlington Borough Council election
1991 Darlington Borough Council election (Borough boundary changes took place but the number of seats remained the same)

Unitary authority elections
1996 Darlington Borough Council election
1999 Darlington Borough Council election
2003 Darlington Borough Council election (New ward boundaries)
2007 Darlington Borough Council election
2011 Darlington Borough Council election
2015 Darlington Borough Council election (New ward boundaries)
2019 Darlington Borough Council election

By-election results

References

External links
Darlington Borough Council
By-election results 

 
Council elections in County Durham
Unitary authority elections in England
Borough of Darlington
Politics of Darlington